Dumbarton is a civil parish in Charlotte County, New Brunswick, Canada, located inland north of St. George and south of Harvey. It comprises a single local service district (LSD), which is a member of the Southwest New Brunswick Service Commission (SNBSC).

The Census subdivision of the same name shares the parish's boundaries.

Origin of name
The parish may have been named for the town of Dumbarton, Scotland, although William Francis Ganong considered this uncertain.

History
Dumbarton was erected from northern Saint Patrick Parish in 1856.

It included a small triangle of Saint Croix Parish southwest of the junction of Wilson Road and Route 127 until 1958.

Boundaries
Dumbarton Parish is bounded:

 on the north by the York County line;
 on the east by the prolongation of the eastern line of a shoreline grant to John McDougall west of Sherard Beach;
 on the south by the southern line of a grant beginning at the mouth of Milligan Brook on the Magaguadavic River, then running westerly along the grant line and its prolongation to the rear line of grants along the Digdeguash River, then southwesterly along the southeastern line of a grant to John Campbell the crosses Route 770 until it strikes the Digdeguash, then upstream about 300 metres to the southeastern line of a grant to John Gillman, then southwesterly along the Gillman grant, crossing Wilson Road, to the rear line of grants along Cathcart Road, then northwesterly about 150 metres, then southwesterly along the southeastern line of a grant to John McFarlane to a point near Route 127;
 on the west by a line beginning near Route 127, then running northwesterly along the southwestern line of grants to John McFarlane and John McKenney to a point about 150 metres south of the old railway, on the eastern line of the Cape Ann Association grant, the easternmost grants of which front on the eastern side of Board Road, then northerly along the Cape Ann grant and its prolongation to the York County line.

Local service district
The local service district of the parish of Dumbarton comprises the entire parish.

The LSD was established in 1969 to assess for community services, in this case to provide ambulance service after local funeral homes ceased doing so. Fire protection was added in 1970.

Today the LSD assesses for only the basic LSD services of fire protection, police services, land use planning, emergency measures, and dog control. The taxing authority is 510.00 Dumbarton.

Communities
Communities at least partly within the parish.

 Berrys Falls
 Clarence Ridge
 Dumbarton
 Flume Ridge
 Greenock
 Hewitt
 Pleasant Ridge
 Rollingdam
 Sorrel Ridge
 Tryon Settlement
 Whittier Ridge

Bodies of water
Bodies of water at least partly within the parish.

 Digdeguash River
 Magaguadavic River
 Clarence Stream
 Kedron Stream
 Big Kedron Lake
 Craig Lake

Islands
Parks, historic sites, and other noteworthy places at least partly within the parish.
 Flume Islands

Demographics

Population

Language

Access Routes
Highways and numbered routes that run through the parish, including external routes that start or finish at the parish limits:

Highways

Principal Routes

Secondary Routes:

External Routes:
None

See also
List of parishes in New Brunswick

Notes

References

Parishes of Charlotte County, New Brunswick
Local service districts of Charlotte County, New Brunswick